Adela Milčinović, née Kamenić (14 January 1878 – 1968), was a Croatian feminist author, critic and suffragette.

Life
Adela Milčinović was born in Sisak, Kingdom of Croatia-Slavonia, Austro-Hungarian Empire (now Croatia) on 14 January 1878, her mother Ludmilla's illegitimate daughter. She received her teacher's qualification from the Sisters of Charity convent in Zagreb in 1896. Three years later, she married Andrija Milčinović, a teacher and student at the University of Zagreb and they moved to Zdenci where Andrija had a teaching job. They spent the years 1902–04 living abroad in Germany and returned to Zagreb in 1904 where her husband finished his degree and got a job with the Museum of Arts and Crafts. They had two daughters and divorced around 1915. Milčinović spent World War I working at the occupation newspaper Belgrade News (Beogradske Novine). She returned to Zagreb in 1918 where she was a secretary at the National Council of the State of Slovenes, Croats and Serbs (Narodno vijeće Države Slovenaca, Hrvata i Srba). She moved to New York City during the 1930s and remained there until her death in 1968.

Activities
Milčinović wrote a letter in Domestic Fireside in which "she presented a well-formulated feminist critique, denouncing the absence of women from public life and outlining her vision of a new aesthetics." While living in Germany, the Milčinovićs published a short-story collection together, Under the Barrage (Pod branom), in 1903 and Adela wrote for the Zagreb newspaper The Nation.

Notes

References

Further reading
 

1878 births
1968 deaths
Croatian feminists
20th-century Croatian women writers
20th-century Croatian writers
Croatian women's rights activists
People from Sisak
Yugoslav emigrants to the United States
Austro-Hungarian expatriates in Germany